A Lost Man (Levantine Arabic rajolon ḍāˀyeˁ) is a 2007 Lebanese film by the Lebanese director Danielle Arbid.

The film premiered on 18 March during the 2007 Cannes Film Festival, in the Directors' Fortnight section. It is possibly the most sexually graphic film ever made by an Arab director. The film was inspired by the life of the French photographer Antoine D'Agata.

Synopsis
The story is about a French photographer Thomas Koré (Melvil Poupaud), who is searching for extraordinary experiences. Koré has become so detached from humanity that the only way he can connect with other people is to have—and photograph—bizarre and demeaning sexual encounters with prostitutes.  When he meets Fouad Saleh (Alexander Siddig), a man with memory problems, he realized that Fouad is even more lost than he, and befriends him. Koré then tries to uncover Fouad's history.

References

External links
 Official website
 
 Directors' Fortnight page on Un homme perdu
 

2007 films
2007 comedy-drama films
2000s Arabic-language films
Lebanese comedy-drama films
2007 comedy films
2007 drama films
Films directed by Danielle Arbid